Sonargaon University (SU) is a private university in Dhaka, Bangladesh. It has four faculties: Science and Engineering; Business and Economics; Humanities and Social Science; and Law and Justice.

It has been accredited by the Government of the People's Republic of Bangladesh, curricula, and academics while its programs have been approved by the University Grants Commission (UGC). It was established under the Private University Act 2010 with the approval of the Government of Bangladesh in December 2012 for awarding degrees in various fields.

Departments

Faculty of Business 

 Department of Business Administration

Faculty of Science & Engineering 

 Department of Architecture
 Department of Computer Science and Engineering
 Department of Civil Engineering
 Department of Electrical and Electronics Engineering
 Department of Naval Architecture and Marine Engineering
 Department of Textile Engineering
 Department of Fashion Design and Technology
 Department of Apparel Manufacture and Technology
 Department of Mechanical Engineering

Faculty of Arts and Humanities 

 Department of Law

Undergraduate programs

 Bachelor of Architecture.(B.Arc.)
 Bachelor of Business Administration (BBA).
 Bachelor of Science in Computer Science and Engineering (CSE).
 Bachelor of Science in Civil Engineering (BCE)
 Bachelor of Science in Electrical and Electronics Engineering (EEE).
 Bachelor of Naval Architecture and Marine Engineering (NAME)
 Bachelor of Textile Engineering (TEX)
 Bachelor of Fashion Design and Technology  (FDT)
 Bachelor of Apparel Manufacture and Technology (AMT)
 Bachelor of Mechanical Engineering. (BME)
 Bachelor of Laws. (LLB)

Graduate programs

Faculty of Business 

Executive Master of Business Administration (EMBA)
MBA in Apparel Merchandising (MAM)
MBA in Supply Chain Management (MSCM)
MBA in Textile & Fashion Marketing
Masters in Bank Management (MBM)
Masters of Business Administration (MBA)
Regular Master of Business Administration (RMBA)

Faculty of Arts and Humanities 

Department of Law (LLM 2 years)
Department of Law (LLM 1 year)

References

External links
 su.edu.bd

Private universities in Bangladesh
Schools in Dhaka District